Blaxit is a social movement that promotes the expatriation of Black/African-African Americans from the United States to destinations abroad. The term Blaxit was coined in the wake of Brexit by academic, journalist, and human rights consultant Dr. Ulysses Burley III. The term combines Black and Exit to form Blaxit in the same manner that Brexit describes the British Exit from the European Union.

History 
The creation of Liberia was a reaction among emancipated Black Americans in the 1820s. Kevin Gaines, the Julian Bond professor of Civil Rights and Social Justice at the University of Virginia, said around 15,000 emancipated and freeborn American Blacks emigrated between the 1820s and the Civil War period and beyond. Other Black Americans emigrated to Canada, which had been a "beacon of freedom" for Black Americans from the time of the Revolutionary War, with hundreds of fugitive enslaved people emigrating by 1830 and more emigrating after the 1850 passage of the Fugitive Slave Act. Prominent abolitionist Mary Ann Shadd emigrated to Canada and encouraged other African Americans to emigrate.

In the early 1900s, many Black creatives emigrated to Europe, pursuing opportunities not available in the US. Ira Aldredge pursued his acting career in Europe because of limited opportunities in the US.

During World War I, when for the first time many Black Americans experienced life in other countries, many decided to remain in France, according to Gaines "where they were treated with respect." Gaines said this created an African-American expatriate community in Paris and other large French cities. In this period Jazz music was introduced to France by James Reese Europe, who had headed the Harlem Hellfighters military band. Josephine Baker found recognition in Paris and later became a French citizen. James Baldwin described his experience in Paris, contrasting them favorably to those in the US. Richard Wright also moved to Paris, and Langston Hughes for a time lived in London. Nina Simone lived in France and several African countries. Paul Robeson testified to the House Committee on Un-American Activities that in Russia, "I felt for the first time like a full human being."

After World War II, when Ghana became the first sub-Saharan colonialized African nation to gain independence in 1957, the country became attractive to US Blacks for travel and emigration. Maya Angelou and W.E.B. Dubois moved there.

In 2019 Ghanaian president Nana Akufo-Addo declared the year the "Year of Return" and made immigration easier for African diaspora. In June 2020, Ghana Minister of Tourism Barbara Oteng Gyasi encouraged Black Americans to emigrate, saying "Africa is waiting for you".

Reasons 
USA Today said "Black Americans, like expatriates of all races and ethnicities, leave the USA temporarily or permanently for different reasons: in search of a better quality of life, for work opportunities, to marry or retire abroad, for tax reasons, for adventure." Kristen West Savali, writing for Essence in January 2020, compared Blaxit to the Great Migration, saying, "it has become increasingly clear that there is no corner of the United States where it is safe to be Black."

Academic Okunini Ọbádélé Kambon moved to Ghana after an arrest in Chicago. He is involved in a Ghanaian program that encourages descendants of Africans to emigrate. Businesswoman Lakeshia Ford moved to Ghana after a yearlong study abroad there; she says in Ghana "I don't have to think of myself as a Black woman...here I am just a woman."

Tiffanie Drayton, whose family moved to the US from Trinidad and Tobago when she was four, in 2013 moved back and is writing a book, Black American Refugee, on the subject of Blaxit. Drayton said driving her children around the block to get them to sleep in Trinidad and Togabo differed significantly from the same experience in the United States: "In America, your hands are shaking. You're worried about what to say. You're worried about whether you have the right ID. You're just so worried all the time." Rapper Mos Def moved to South Africa in 2013 to escape racism, although in January 2016, he was ordered to leave having stayed in the country illegally on an expired tourist visa granted in May 2013, and finally allowed to leave later that year, barred from ever returning.

References 

African diaspora
African-American diaspora